Borkhar County Mass Transit Organization is a public transport agency running Transit buses in Borkhar County, located north of Isfahan, in Greater Isfahan Region, Central Iran. This transit agency has 7 lines, 5 inter-urban, and 2 local. It serves the cities of Dastgerd, Dolatabad, Khorzuq, Habibabad, and Komeshcheh with the inter-urban lines that connect them to Isfahan, and the municipalities of Shadpurabad and Sin, connected to Dolatabad with two local lines.

The county is also served by a line operated by Shahinshahr and Suburbs Bus Organization, connecting Dastgerd, Dolatabad, and Habibabad to Shahinshahr and Gaz.

Routes

References

Bus transport in Iran
Transportation in Isfahan Province
Borkhar County
Transport in Isfahan